As a medical term, malaise is a feeling of general discomfort, uneasiness or lack of wellbeing and often the first sign of an infection or other disease. The word has existed in French since at least the 12th century.

The term is often used figuratively in other contexts, in addition to its meaning as a general state of angst or melancholy.

Cause 
Malaise is a non-specific symptom and can be present in the slightest ailment, such as an emotion (causing fainting, a vasovagal response) or hunger (light hypoglycemia), to the most serious conditions (cancer, stroke, heart attack, internal bleeding, etc.).

Malaise expresses a patient's uneasiness that "something is not right" that may need a medical examination to determine the significance.

Malaise is thought to be caused by the activation of an immune response, and the associated pro-inflammatory cytokines.

Figurative use
"Economic malaise" refers to an economy that is stagnant or in recession (compare depression). The term is particularly associated with the 1973–75 United States recession. An era of American automotive history, centered around the 1970s, is similarly called the "malaise era."

The "Crisis of Confidence" speech made by US President Jimmy Carter in 1979 is commonly referred to as the "malaise speech", although the word itself was not actually in the speech.

See also 
 Ennui
 Fatigue (medical)
 Malaise Créole
 Post-exertional malaise
 Prodrome
 Torpor

Notes and references

External links 

 

Symptoms and signs
Emotions
French medical phrases